Yannick Schoepen (born February 14, 1992) is a Belgian professional basketball player. Schoepen plays the center position, and currently plays for Basics Melsele-Beveren.

External links
Eurobasket.com Profile

References

1992 births
Living people
Belgian men's basketball players
Centers (basketball)
Antwerp Giants players